Dirma is a commune of the Cercle of Youwarou in the Mopti Region of Mali. The main village (chef-lieu) is Ambiri. In 2009 the commune had a population of 8,121.

References

External links
.

Communes of Mopti Region